Julián Montoya (born 29 October 1993) is an Argentine rugby union player currently playing for the Leicester Tigers in England's Premiership Rugby, the top domestic level of rugby union. He plays as a hooker.

Montoya played for Club Newman domestically in Argentina and Pampas XV. He has been an  international since 2014. He was Premiership Rugby champion in 2022 with Leicester.

Career

Montoya played for Argentina national under-20 rugby union team at the 2013 IRB Junior World Championship. He later would also play for Argentina Jaguars. He had his first cap for Argentina at the 65–9 win over Uruguay, at 17 May 2014, for the South American Rugby Championship, in Paysandu, Brazil. He played for the Argentina squad that won the competition in 2014 and 2015, twice in each of them, with a try scored on both occasions. He was called for the 2015 Rugby Championship, playing his first game at the tournament in the 39–18 loss to New Zealand, on 17 July 2015, in Christchurch. He has 8 caps for the "Pumas", with 2 tries scored, 10 points on aggregate.

Montoya was a starter for the  national team on 14 November 2020 in their first ever win against the All Blacks.

In June 2020 there was speculation that Montoya had agreed to join Leicester Tigers for the 2021-22 Premiership Rugby season, but the move was eventually confirmed as an immediate transfer on 20 January 2021. He started the 2022 Premiership Rugby final as Tigers beat Saracens 15-12.

References

External links
Julián Montoya at UAR Official Website (Spanish)

1993 births
Living people
Argentine rugby union players
Argentina international rugby union players
Club Newman rugby union players
Jaguares (Super Rugby) players
Pampas XV players
Rugby union hookers
Rugby union players from Buenos Aires
People educated at Colegio Cardenal Newman
Leicester Tigers players